Screw Up is the 1994 debut studio album by Japanese group Super Junky Monkey. It showcased their fusion of rap, hardcore, punk, and funk music. It was released in Japan and, in 1995, the United States.

Critical reception
AllMusic called the album "a surprising success," writing that "listeners may not be sure what to make of Super Junky Monkey, but anyone looking for a unique take on rock and metal would surely find themselves greatly amused and delighted." Trouser Press wrote that "Super Junky Monkey bring the chops and enormous flexibility to their funhouse vision of modern music, but sometimes crazy shit is just crazy shit." The Baltimore Sun called the band "eclectic" and "daring," writing that "'Kioku no netsuzou' alternates between crunchy Metallica-style power riffs and angular, King Crimson dissonance before dropping a few rap-style rhymes."

Track listing
Shukuchoku No Choro Wa Chirou De Sourou (Old Man On The Nightshift With Prostatitis)
Zakuro No Hone (Bone Of Pomegranate)
Kioku No Netsuzou (Fabrication Of Memory)
Buckin’ The Bolts
Bakabatka (All Stupid)
Tamage—Shiyoumae (Tamage Before)
Ukatousen
Popobar
Where’re The Good Times
Revenge
 Decide
 Get Out
 Tamage—Shiyougo (Tamage After)
 We’re The Mother
Shower
Fuji Funka Sunzen (Mt. Fuji About To Erupt)
untitled bonus track

References

1994 albums
Super Junky Monkey albums